Joseph Norman Malloy (September 27, 1913 – December 16, 1964) was a Canadian ice hockey player who competed in the 1932 Winter Olympics.

He was born in Kinkora, Ontario.

In 1932 he was a member of the Winnipeg Hockey Club, the Canadian team which won the gold medal. He played five matches and scored three goals.

External links
Norman Malloy's profile at databaseOlympics
Norman Malloy's profile at Sports Reference.com

1913 births
1964 deaths
Canadian ice hockey right wingers
Ice hockey people from Ontario
Ice hockey players at the 1932 Winter Olympics
Medalists at the 1932 Winter Olympics
Olympic gold medalists for Canada
Olympic ice hockey players of Canada
Olympic medalists in ice hockey
People from Perth County, Ontario
Winnipeg Hockey Club players